Antena 3 Noticias ("Antena 3 News") is the brand for Spanish broadcaster Antena 3's news programmes.

Programme format
The programme is generally presented by two newsreaders, with additional newsreaders for the sport. Most items will be made up of reports and are generally preceded and followed by the correspondent reporting live (Directo) from the scene of the report. The programme is followed by a weather report known as El Tiempo. The entire running time including commercial breaks and El Tiempo is one hour.

Broadcast times
The programme is broadcast three times daily with each of the broadcasts being numbered (e.g. Antena 3 Noticias de la Mañana, Antena 3 Noticias 2 etc.) The flagship evening programme goes out head to head with the programme Telediario on rival public network TVE.

1989 Spanish television series debuts
Spanish television news shows
1980s Spanish television series
1990s Spanish television series
2000s Spanish television series
2010s Spanish television series